Walter Lewis (born April 26, 1962) is a former American and Canadian football quarterback. He played for the Memphis Showboats of the United States Football League (USFL) and the Montreal Alouettes of the Canadian Football League (CFL). He played college football at Alabama, Where he was the first African American quarterback to start for the Crimson Tide and legendary Hall of Fame coach Bear Bryant. He was also the last quarterback to start for Bryant.

At Alabama, Lewis played in 44 games from 1980-1983, passing for 4,257 yards with 29 touchdowns. He was named first team quarterback on the 1983 All-SEC football team.

Playing for the Memphis Showboats of the USFL, Lewis split time with Mike Kelley both seasons. In 1984, he completed 161 of 276 passes (58%) for 1,862 yards, 15 touchdowns, and 10 interceptions, and also ran 60 times for 552 yards and 5 touchdowns. In 1985, Lewis completed 97 of 184 (53%) for 1,593 yards, 16 touchdowns and 5 interceptions, and also rushed 65 times for 591 yards and 4 touchdowns.

References

1962 births
Living people
People from Brewton, Alabama
Players of American football from Alabama
American football quarterbacks
Canadian football quarterbacks
Alabama Crimson Tide football players
Memphis Showboats players
Montreal Alouettes players
American players of Canadian football